Yomei Seamount is a seamount of the Hawaiian-Emperor seamount chain in the northern Pacific Ocean.

Its eruption ages are unknown, but the seamounts on either side are in the 56.2 to 59.6 million range during the Paleogene Period.

See also
List of volcanoes in the Hawaiian – Emperor seamount chain

References

Bibliography

Hawaiian–Emperor seamount chain
Guyots
Hotspot volcanoes
Seamounts of the Pacific Ocean
Paleocene volcanoes
Paleogene Oceania